Kaweenakumik Islands Ecological Reserve is an ecological reserve located on several islands in Lake Kaweenakumik, Manitoba, Canada. It was established in 1989 under the Manitoba Ecological Reserves Act.

See also
 List of ecological reserves in Manitoba
 List of protected areas of Manitoba

References

External links
 Kaweenakumik Islands Ecological Reserve, Backgrounder
 iNaturalist: Kaweenakumik Islands Ecological Reserve

Protected areas established in 1989
Ecological reserves of Manitoba
Nature reserves in Manitoba
Protected areas of Manitoba